PL360 (or PL/360) is a system programming language designed by Niklaus Wirth and written by Wirth, Joseph W. Wells Jr., and Edwin Satterthwaite Jr. for the IBM System/360 computer at Stanford University. A description of PL360 was published in early 1968, although the implementation was probably completed before Wirth left Stanford in 1967.

Description
PL/360 is a one pass compiler with a syntax similar to ALGOL that provides facilities for specifying exact machine code (language) instructions and registers similar to assembly language, but also provides features commonly found in high-level programming languages, such as complex arithmetic expressions and control structures. Wirth used PL360 to create ALGOL W.

Data types are:
 Byte or character – 1 byte
 Short integer – 2 bytes, interpreted as an integer in two's complement binary notation
 Integer or logical – 4 bytes, interpreted as an integer in two's complement binary notation
 Real – 4 bytes, interpreted as a base-16 (hexadecimal) short floating-point arithmetic number
 Long real – 8 bytes, interpreted as a base-16 long floating-point number

Registers can contain integer, real, or long real.

Individual System/360 instructions can be generated inline using the PL360 "function statement" that defined an instruction by format and operation code. Function arguments were assigned sequentially to fields in the instruction. Examples are:

Example
R0, R1, and R2, and FLAG are predeclared names.

    BEGIN INTEGER BUCKET;
         IF FLAG THEN
         BEGIN BUCKET := R0; R0 := R1; R1 := R2;
               R2 := BUCKET;
         END ELSE
         BEGIN BUCKET := R2; R2 := R1; R1 := R0;
              R0 := BUCKET;
         END
         RESET(FLAG);
    END

Implementation
Wirth was at Stanford between 1963 and 1967, during the earlier part of which he was developing his Euler compiler and interpreter, the sources of which are dated 1965. Also in 1965, Stanford updated their drum memory based Burroughs large systems B5000 to a disk storage based B5500.

Since the target IBM S/360 (which was to replace an existing IBM 7090) was not installed until 1967, the initial implementation of PL360 was written in ALGOL and tested on Stanford's B5500. Once working, the compiler was then recoded in PL360, recompiled on the Burroughs system, and moved as a binary file to the S/360.

The B5500 is programmed in a high-level ALGOL-derived language Executive Systems Problem Oriented Language (ESPOL), and PL360 was intended to bring a comparable facility to the IBM mainframe architecture, although it was lacking major facilities of both Assembler F and ESPOL. This intent was largely ignored, with programmers continuing to use implementations of IBM's macro assemblers.

However, in the early 1970s, PL360 was extended to provide more capabilities, and was the programming language of choice for developing Stanford Physics Information Retrieval System (SPIRES), Stanford's Database Management System.

See also
 IBM PL/S
 High-level assembler

Notes

References

External links
 
 

 PL360 Textbook
 PL360@Everything2

Procedural programming languages
IBM System/360 mainframe line
Programming languages created in 1966